Save the Children Australia is an aid and development agency dedicated to helping children in Australia and overseas. It is an independent, not-for-profit and secular organisation.

Save the Children Australia is a member of the Save the Children International, a group of 30 organisations sharing a global vision and strategy for improving the lives of children worldwide.
 
Save the Children Australia, and the other members of the Save the Children Association, focus on responding to humanitarian emergencies, reducing infant and child mortality, protecting children from violence, and ensuring all children have access to a quality basic education.

In 2014, Save the Children Australia responded to 18 humanitarian emergencies, and ran 149 projects that reached 12 million people in 29 countries.

History
Save the Children was founded in England by Eglantyne Jebb, a teacher and sociologist, in 1919. Known then as the International Save the Children Fund, the organisation's first goal was to supply food to starving children in Austria, what was then Austria-Hungary, immediately after World War I.

Jebb had a strong vision and dedication to children's rights and developed five directives that she believed were the fundamental rights of every child. She lobbied the League of Nations until they adopted these rights in 1924. They have since formed the basis of the United Nations Declaration of the Rights of the Child (1959) and inspired the current Convention on the Rights of the Child (1990). These rights remain the foundation of Save the Children's vision and values.

In the same year, Save the Children began in England, its first Australian branch was opened by Cecilia John in Melbourne, Australia, to assist refugees affected by war in Europe. This was soon followed by branches opening in Queensland in 1920 and South Australia in 1922. Over the next 50 years, more branches were established in every state across Australia to assist children in Europe and the Middle East.

In 1951, the health and education of children in Australia became a priority for Save the Children branches across the country. Welfare centres and pre-schools for Aboriginal and Torres Strait Islander children in Victoria were among the first of its Australian programs.

In 2004, the branches started a process of consolidation to create a single, national organisation called Save the Children Australia.

On 20 May 2015, Save the Children Australia and Good Beginnings Australia announced their plans to merge. Good Beginnings Australia specialises in providing early intervention and practical parenting programs for children and their families in disadvantaged communities. The merger came into force on 1 July 2015 and Good Beginning Australia's programs are now part of Save the Children Australia.

Structure
Save the Children Australia's national office is located in Melbourne, Victoria. It also has regional offices in Queensland, Tasmania, New South Wales, Victoria, Western Australia, South Australia, and the Northern Territory, running programs and events that support communities at a local level.

Save the Children Australia is a member of the Save the Children Association, a group of 30 child-focused organisations supporting children in more than 124 countries. The members of the Save the Children Association work through a single operational structure, Save the Children International (registered in London, United Kingdom), when implementing projects internationally.

Save the Children Australia's international projects, except for those in the Pacific, are implemented through Save the Children International and local Save the Children partners.

Humanitarian emergencies
A large part of Save the Children Australia's work is responding to emergencies in Australia and overseas, providing humanitarian aid such as water, food, shelter, temporary learning spaces and emotional support for children.

In 2014, Save the Children Australia responded to 18 humanitarian crises and reached 808,000 people.

In 2015, Save the Children Australia has responded to Cyclone Pam in Vanuatu (March) and the Nepal earthquakes (April/May), as well as continuing its response to longer term emergencies such as the South Sudan Crisis and the Syria Crisis.

Programs
Save the Children Australia runs development programs across Australia and overseas, with a particular focus on Asia and the Pacific.

The agency partners with local non-governmental organisations (NGOs), community-based organisations, local and national governments, and international non-governmental organisations (INGOs) to deliver projects in-country.

International programs
In 2014, Save the Children Australia reached more than 12 million children and adults in 29 countries focusing on:
 
 Fighting inequality 
 Helping children in emergencies 
 Protecting children from harm 
 Providing education 
 Providing healthcare 
 Tackling climate change 
 Standing up for child rights

Australian programs
In 2014, Save the Children Australia reached more than 34,000 Australian children and adults in more than 150 sites across the country, focusing on:

 Helping children in emergencies 
 Helping children learn 
 Protecting children from harm

Advocacy and campaigns
In addition to its humanitarian and development programs, Save the Children Australia campaigns for long-term change to improve children's lives.

Australian aid
Save the Children Australia supports the Campaign for Australian Aid, which is a joint initiative of the Make Poverty History and Micah Challenge coalitions.

There have been successive cuts made to Australia's foreign aid budget, reducing Australia's national contribution to international development. The campaign aims to create a movement of people pushing for a stronger commitment to foreign aid from the Australian government.

Children in detention
Australia has a policy of mandatory detention of asylum seekers, including children. Save the Children Australia's Kids in Detention campaign calls for children and the families to be immediately released from immigration detention.

Fundraising
Save the Children fund-raises from the public through regular giving propositions such as I Save the Children and Children in Crisis, as well as single appeal donations.

It also has a number of community fundraising initiatives such as Run to Save and fundraising in celebration.

In 2015, Save the Children Australia launched its inaugural Christmas in July fundraising campaign.

Op Shops
Save the Children Australia has Op Shops in Queensland, South Australia, Tasmania, Victoria and Western Australia. It also has an online shop.

Nauru Detention Centre
In October 2012, Save the Children began providing services to children at the Australian Government’s offshore asylum seeker detention centres, first on Manus Island in Papua New Guinea and then on Nauru at the Nauru Detention Centre in August 2013. Services are no longer provided on Manus Island, following the removal of children from detention there.

In Nauru, Save the Children Australia provides welfare, education and recreation services to asylum seekers in the detention centre.
 
On 2 October 2014, the Department of Immigration and Border Protection (DIBP) issued Save the Children Australia with a notice of the removal of nine members of staff after claims the aid workers were coaching detainees to self-harm and fabricate abuse claims to achieve evacuations. An independent review into the allegations was carried out by former Integrity Commissioner Philip Moss. The review was released on 20 March 2015 and found no evidence to support the allegations against the nine Save the Children staff members.

The child rights agency reported that it was "deeply troubled" by the evidence provided in the report supporting claims of sexual and physical assaults against children and adults in mandatory immigration detention on Nauru. The agency's CEO, Paul Ronalds, stated that "there was never any need for fabrication or exaggeration by Save the Children staff – the evidence is clear."

A week after the release of the Moss Review, the Australian Senate announced an inquiry into the review's findings. Save the Children Australia's submission to the inquiry calls on the Australian government to eliminate prolonged and mandatory detention of children and work towards a genuine regional framework that protects children fleeing conflict and persecution.

Accountability
The Board of Save the Children Australia delegates the responsibility for the day-to-day administration of the company to its chief executive officer (CEO) who, together with its Executive team, is accountable to the Board.

The role of Save the Children Australia's CEO and its chairman are separate. With a maximum of 14 directors, Save the Children Australia must have at least one director resident in each State.

Each year, the Save the Children Australia publishes an Annual Report, detailing successes and challenges in its programs, governance, financial statements and an independent auditor's report.

In 2014, for every dollar donated to Save the Children Australia, 84 cents was invested in its development, campaigning and humanitarian response programs; 9 cents was spent on fundraising; 5 cents was spent on staff, infrastructure and systems; and 2 cents was invested in commercial activities such as its retail stores.

Save the Children Australia is a member of the Australian Council for International Development (ACFID) and is a signatory to its Code of Conduct.

See also
 Save the Children
 Save the Children International
 Save the Children USA
 Save the Children State of the World's Mothers report
 Declaration of the Rights of the Child
 Convention on the Rights of the Child

References

Further reading
 Clare Mulley, "The Woman Who Saved the Children: A biography of Eglantyne Jebb, Founder of Save the Children" (Oneworld Publications, 2009) .

External links
 Save the Children Australia website
 Save the Children Australia – Latest News
 Save the Children Australia – Online Shop
 Save the Children International website
 Good Beginnings Australia website
 Campaign for Australian Aid

1919 establishments in Australia
Organizations established in 1919
Organisations based in Melbourne
Australia
Children's charities based in Australia
Organisations serving Indigenous Australians
Non-profit organisations based in Victoria (Australia)